This list of banks in Lithuania is based on information from Central Bank of Lithuania, responsible for financial supervision in Lithuania.

Central bank
Bank of Lithuania

Commercial banks
In 2023, twelve commercial banks holding a license from the Bank of Lithuania are operating in the country:

AB Swedbank (subsidiary of the Swedish bank)
AB SEB bankas (subsidiary of SEB, Sweden)
UAB Revolut Bank (subsidiary of the British bank)
AB Šiaulių bankas (Lithuanian)
UAB Medicinos bankas (Lithuanian)
UAB PayRay Bank (Lithuanian)
AB Mano bankas1 (Lithuanian)
UAB GF bankas1 (subsidiary of Marginalen Bank, Sweden)
European Merchant Bank1 (Lithuanian)
UAB SME Bank1 (Lithuanian)
UAB Finora Bank1 (subsidiary of the Estonian bank)
AB Fjord Bank1 (Lithuanian)

1 Institutions that only hold a specialised bank licence. 

Additionally, Saldo Finance was granted a specialised bank licence in autumn of 2021, but is not providing banking services at the moment.

Foreign banks' branches
Currently, the following foreign bank branches are operating in the country:
Luminor Bank
OP Corporate Bank
Citadele Banka
Bigbank
Inbank
Danske bankas

Additionally, the following branches are registered to operate in the country:
PayEx Sverige
Svenska Handelsbanken AB - undergoing liquidation

References

List of banks in Lithuania
Banks
 
Lithuania
Lithuania